The men's water polo tournament at the 2017 Southeast Asian Games were held at the National Aquatic Centre, Bukit Jalil, Kuala Lumpur from 15 to 20 August 2017. The competition will be held in a round-robin format, where the top 3 teams at the end of the competition will win the gold, silver, and bronze medal respectively.

Competition schedule
The following was the competition schedule for the men's water polo competitions:

Squads

Results
All times are Malaysia Standard Time (UTC+08:00)

Round-robin

Final standings

See also
Women's tournament

References

Men
Southeast Asian Games